The 19th Division was a Syrian rebel group which fought in the Syrian Civil War. The group was created in June 2013 in the western countryside of the Aleppo Governorate as a part of a foreign-funded project to unify local Free Syrian Army-affiliated factions into bigger factions.

History

In September 2012, the Ansar Brigade (Liwa al-Ansar) was formed as part of the Mutasim Billah Brigades in the western Aleppo countryside. The group was known for producing improvised fighting vehicles. In June 2013, the group joined several other rebel groups in the area and formed the 19th Division.

In late June 2013, a rebel court in Darat Izza arrested a media activist after he criticized Lt. Col. Muhammad Bakur, commander of the Ansar Brigade of the 19th Division. The arrest was condemned by an opposition court in Atarib, which demanded the Darat Izza court to release him.

On 22 July 2013, the Supporters of the Caliphate Brigade, part of the 19th Division, along with al-Qaeda's al-Nusra Front, took part in a massacre of 51 Syrian Army soldiers in Khan al-Asal.

On 25 September 2013, the 19th Division signed a statement, along with 12 other Syrian rebel groups, in which it rejected any foreign-based opposition group, including the Syrian National Council.

See also
Khan al-Assal massacre
List of armed groups in the Syrian Civil War

References

Anti-government factions of the Syrian civil war
Free Syrian Army
Military units and formations established in 2013
Anti-ISIL factions in Syria
Sunni Islamist groups